Padārtha is a Sanskrit word for "categories" in Vaisheshika and Nyaya schools of Indian philosophy.

Definition 
The term “Padārtha” derived from two “Pada” or word and “Artha” or the meaning or referent. Therefore etymologically the term Padārtha means “the meaning or referent of words”.

Philosophical significance
Almost all the philosophical systems of India accept liberation as the ultimate goal of life; it is the summum bonum. For attaining liberation different philosophies prescribe different means. According to Aksapada Gautama, liberation can be attained by the true knowledge of the categories or padārthas. According to the Vaisheshika school, all things which exist, which can be cognised, and which can be named are padārthas (literal meaning: the meaning of a word), the objects of experience.

Types

From Vaisheshika view points 
According to Vaisheshika school of philosophy Padārtha or all objects of experience can be primarily divided as "Bhāva" and "Abhāva". The bhāva padārthas are six types. These are:

Dravya (substance),
Guṇa (quality),
Karma (activity),
Sāmānya (generality),
Viśeṣa (particularity)
Samavāya (inherence).

Later Vaiśeṣikas like, Śrīdhara and Udayana and Śivāditya added one more category abhava which means non-existence.

From Nyaya view points 

The Nyāya metaphysics recognizes sixteen padarthas or categories and includes all six (or seven) categories of the Vaiśeṣika in the second one of them, called prameya. These are:

Pramāṇa (valid means of knowledge),
Prameya (objects of valid knowledge),
Saṃśaya (doubt),
Prayojana (aim),
Dṛṣṭānta (example),
Siddhānta (conclusion),
Avayava (members of syllogism),
Tarka (hypothetical reasoning),
Nirṇaya (settlement),
Vāda (discussion),
Jalpa (wrangling),
Vitaṇḍā (cavilling),
Hetvābhāsa (fallacy),
Chala (quibbling),
Jāti (sophisticated refutation)
Nigrahasthāna (point of defeat)

From western philosophical view points 
The Vaiśeṣika categories or  Padārthas are separate from the categories of Aristotle, Kant and Hegel. According to Aristotle, categories are logical classification of predicates; Kant states that categories are only patterns of the understanding and Hegel’s categories are dynamic stages in the development of thought, but the Vaiśeṣika categories are metaphysical classification of all knowable objects. Aristotle accepts ten categories: 1. Substance, 2. Quality, 3. Quantity, 4. Relation, 5 Place, 6. Time, 7. Posture, 8. Property, 9. Activity, and 10. Passivity. The Vaiśeṣikas instead place the concepts of time and place under substance; relation under quality; inherence, quantity and property under quality. Passivity is considered the opposite of activity. Gautama enumerates sixteen Padārthas.

See also 
The Categories or Padārtha
Nyaya Padārtha
Kanada

References

External links 
 Category in the Encyclopædia Britannica
 Padārtha in the Stanford Encyclopedia of Philosophy

Hindu philosophical concepts
Philosophical categories